Poindexter is an unincorporated community in Louisa County, Virginia, United States It is located at the 4-way intersection of minor Virginia State Routes 613 (Poindexter Road) and 640 (Jack Jouett Road). State Route 717 (Central Branch Road) spurs off of State Route 613 nearby.

A post office and store once operated in Poindexter. Citations suggest that the community is named for the postman that operated them around the 1850s.

Geography

Churches
Churches in the Poindexter area are:
 Foster Creek Baptist Church (built 1795 as Siloam Baptist Church)
 Berea Baptist Church (built 1857)

References

Unincorporated communities in Virginia
Unincorporated communities in Louisa County, Virginia